Filip-Ioan Ugran (born 12 September 2002) is a Romanian race car driver who is set to compete in the 2023 FIA World Endurance Championship with Prema Racing. He last competed in the 2022 European Le Mans Series for Algarve Pro Racing, and in the 2022 Euroformula Open Championship for Van Amersfoort Racing. He has raced in the FIA Formula 3 Championship, and is a race winner in the Italian and Spanish Formula 4 championships.

Early career

Karting 
Ugran made his motorsport debut in karting in 2016, where he remained active until 2018. The Romanian took part in championships such as the WSK Super Master Series, WSK Final Cup and the CIK-FIA International Super Cup. He also raced in the 2016 edition of the CIK-FIA Karting Academy Trophy, where he finished 38th.

Lower formulae

2019 
In 2019, he made his debut in formula racing in the Italian F4 Championship with BVM Racing. He was the only driver in the team to drive the entire season, making for a difficult debut year. Only with a tenth place in the season finale at the Monza did he manage to score a point, putting him in 26th place in the standings. He also drove as a guest driver for BVM in a race weekend of the ADAC Formula 4 Championship at the Hockenheimring, where he finished 14th in both races. At the end of the year, Ugran drove in the season finale of the F4 Spanish Championship at the Circuit de Barcelona-Catalunya with Jenzer Motorsport. He finished on the podium in all races, with two second places and one third place, but because he was a guest driver, he was not awarded any championship points.

2020 
In 2020, Ugran remained active in Italian F4, switching to Jenzer Motorsport. His results improved significantly, and he scored his first win during the second round at the Imola Circuit. He missed the third round at the Red Bull Ring but was back on the podium during the next round in Mugello. He collected one more podium during the next round at Monza. Ugran was on the podium a total of five times during the season, which led to him finishing eighth in the standings with 133 points. The Romanian also drove for Jenzer in the Spanish F4 race weekend at Le Castellet, where he won two races and finished second in the third. With 55 points, he finished tenth in the standings despite competing in only that one weekend.

FIA Formula 3 Championship

2021 

For the 2021 season, Ugran remained with Jenzer Motorsport but progressed to the FIA Formula 3 Championship, where he partnered Calan Williams. At the first round in Barcelona, the Romanian found himself fighting for positions in the lower midfield, and issues with tyre management in France as well as troubles with track limits at Spielberg left the Romanian bottom of the standings after the opening third of the season, with the best race result of 21st place. Ugran managed to achieve a then-best finish of 19th in race two in Budapest and Spa-Francorchamps, allowing the Romanian to move off the bottom of the table. At the penultimate round in Zandvoort, Ugran qualified a season-best 21st and finished 15th in race one, bettering his previous best finishing position by four places. In the second race, Ugran managed to end up in 12th at the checkered flag but was demoted to 24th after the race stewards found him guilty of a collision with Jonny Edgar. The Romanian did not score points in the final weekend at Sochi. Ugran finished 31st in the drivers' standings, the second-lowest of all full-timers.

2022 

Ugran drove for Jenzer Motorsport, Charouz Racing System and Van Amersfoort Racing during 2021 post-season testing. However, he was not selected for any team and left the series.

Ugran returned to Formula 3 for the Silverstone round of the championship, replacing Alexander Smolyar, who could not race in the United Kingdom due to Visa issues. He finished his races 23rd and 18th, before handing his seat back to Smolyar for the Spielberg round. Ugran ended the year 36th in the standings.

Euroformula Open Championship 
Ugran moved to the Euroformula Open Championship in 2022, signing for Van Amersfoort Racing. Ugran did manage one podium during the season, where he placed third in the Paul Ricard round. However, after four rounds into the season, Van Amersfoort Racing left Euroformula Open with immediate effect, leaving Ugran without a seat. This left him to end ninth in the standings.

Sportscar career

European Le Mans Series 
After being left without a drive after the 2022 Euroformula Open Championship, he joined the 2022 European Le Mans Series with Algarve Pro Racing alongside Bent Viscaal for the remaining two rounds of the campaign. Ugran ended both rounds in eighth and fifth place.

FIA World Endurance Championship

2023 season 
Ugran's 2023 campaign would be in the FIA World Endurance Championship with Prema Racing in the LMP2 category, driving alongside Bent Viscaal, Juan Manuel Correa and Andrea Caldarelli.

Karting record

Karting career summary

Complete CIK-FIA Karting Academy Trophy results 
(key) (Races in bold indicate pole position) (Races in italics indicate fastest lap)

Racing record

Racing career summary 

† As Ugran was a guest driver, he was ineligible to score points.

Complete ADAC Formula 4 Championship results 
(key) (Races in bold indicate pole position) (Races in italics indicate fastest lap)

† As Ugran was a guest driver, he was ineligible to score points.

Complete Italian F4 Championship results 
(key) (Races in bold indicate pole position) (Races in italics indicate fastest lap)

Complete F4 Spanish Championship results 
(key) (Races in bold indicate pole position) (Races in italics indicate fastest lap)

† As Ugran was a guest driver, he was ineligible to score points.

Complete FIA Formula 3 Championship results 
(key) (Races in bold indicate pole position; races in italics indicate points for the fastest lap of top ten finishers)

† Driver did not finish the race, but was classified as they completed more than 90% of the race distance.

Complete Euroformula Open Championship results 
(key) (Races in bold indicate pole position) (Races in italics indicate fastest lap)

Complete European Le Mans Series results 
(key) (Races in bold indicate pole position; results in italics indicate fastest lap)

Complete FIA World Endurance Championship results

References

External links 
 
  
  

2002 births
Living people
Romanian racing drivers
Italian F4 Championship drivers
ADAC Formula 4 drivers
Spanish F4 Championship drivers
FIA Formula 3 Championship drivers
People from Târgu Mureș
BVM Racing drivers
Jenzer Motorsport drivers
Euroformula Open Championship drivers
MP Motorsport drivers
Van Amersfoort Racing drivers
European Le Mans Series drivers
FIA World Endurance Championship drivers
Prema Powerteam drivers